Heroes is a live album by pianist Gil Evans and saxophonist Lee Konitz recorded in New York in 1980 and released on the French Verve label.

Critical reception

The Allmusic review stated "Since Evans was far from a virtuoso and at best played "arranger's piano" (particularly at this late stage in his life), his accompaniment behind Konitz is quite sparse ... overall this is a rather uneventful and often dull release that can easily be passed by".

Track listing 
 "Prince of Darkness" (Wayne Shorter) - 6:08
 "Reincarnation of a Lovebird" (Charles Mingus) - 6:45
 "Aprilling" (Lee Konitz) - 8:23
 "What Am I Here For?" (Duke Ellington) - 6:13
 "All the Things You Are" (Jerome Kern, Oscar Hammerstein II) - 6:49 	
 "Prelude No. 20 in C Minor, Opus 28" (Frédéric Chopin) - 6:15
 "Blues Improvisation/Zee Zee" (Gil Evans) - 6:14
 "Lover Man (Oh, Where Can You Be?)" (Jimmy Davis, Ram Ramirez, Jimmy Sherman) - 6:21

Personnel 
Lee Konitz – alto saxophone, soprano saxophone
Gil Evans – piano

References 

Lee Konitz live albums
Gil Evans live albums
Verve Records live albums
1991 live albums
Collaborative albums